The UTS Faculty of Design, Architecture and Building (abbreviated as DAB)  is the faculty of design and architecture at the University of Technology Sydney. It offers bachelor's, master's, and doctoral degrees to more than 5,000 students.

Programs
The faculty offers various degree and non–degree options for students interested in design and architecture.

Undergraduate

Single
 Bachelor of Design in Animation
 Bachelor of Design in Fashion and Textiles	
 Bachelor of Design in Interior Architecture	
 Bachelor of Design in Photography	
 Bachelor of Design in Product Design	
 Bachelor of Design in Visual Communication
 Bachelor of Design in Architecture
 Bachelor of Construction Project Management	
 Bachelor of Property Economics

Combined
 Bachelor of Design in Animation and Bachelor of Arts in International Studies	
 Bachelor of Design in Animation and Bachelor of Creative Intelligence and Innovation	
 Bachelor of Design in Fashion and Textiles and Bachelor of Arts in International Studies	
 Bachelor of Design in Fashion and Textiles and Bachelor of Creative Intelligence and Innovation	
 Bachelor of Design in Interior Architecture and Bachelor of Arts in International Studies	
 Bachelor of Design in Interior Architecture and Bachelor of Creative Intelligence and Innovation	
 Bachelor of Design in Photography and Bachelor of Arts in International Studies	
 Bachelor of Design in Product Design and Bachelor of Arts in International Studies	
 Bachelor of Design in Product Design and Bachelor of Creative Intelligence and Innovation	
 Bachelor of Design in Visual Communication and Bachelor of Arts in International Studies
 Bachelor of Design in Architecture Bachelor of Creative Intelligence and Innovation
 Bachelor of Construction Project Management and Bachelor of Arts in International Studies	
 Bachelor of Property Economics and Bachelor of Arts in International Studies

Honours
 Bachelor of Landscape Architecture (Honours)
 Bachelor of Design (Honours) in Animation	
 Bachelor of Design (Honours) in Fashion and Textiles	
 Bachelor of Design (Honours) in Interior Architecture	
 Bachelor of Design (Honours) in Photography	
 Bachelor of Design (Honours) in Product Design	
 Bachelor of Design (Honours) in Visual Communication

Graduate
 Master of Design
 Master of Architecture	
 Master of Landscape Architecture
 Master of Planning	
 Master of Urban Design
 Master of Project Management	
 Master of Property Development	
 Master of Property Development and Investment	
 Master of Property Development and Planning	
 Master of Property Development and Project Management	
 Master of Real Estate Investment

Notable alumni
 Rebecca Cooper – Founder, bec & bridge fashion label  
 Kim Crestani – Director, Order Architects  
 Casey Gee Hoon Hyun – Creative Design Manager, Hyundai Design Centre 
 David Holms – Architect and Adjunct Professor at the University of Technology Sydney
 David McDonald — Director, WT Partnerships (Asia)

References

External links